Israel was represented by 16 athletes at the 2010 European Athletics Championships held in Barcelona, Spain.

Participants

Results

Men
Track and road events

Field events

Women
Track and road events

Field events

References 
Participants list (men)
Participants list (women)

Nations at the 2010 European Athletics Championships
2010
European Athletics Championships